Bhandara–Gondiya Lok Sabha constituency is one of the 48 Lok Sabha (parliamentary) constituencies of Maharashtra state in western India. This constituency came into existence in 2008 as a part of the implementation of the Presidential notification on delimitation of parliamentary constituencies, based on the recommendations of the Delimitation Commission of India constituted in 2002 and Bhandara Lok Sabha constituency ceased to exist. Three of its assembly segments are in Bhandara district, while the other three are in Gondia district.(Member of parliament) resigned recently (2014-2017).

Assembly segments
Presently, Bhandara–Gondiya Lok Sabha constituency comprises six Vidhan Sabha (legislative assembly) segments. These segments with constituency number and reservations (if any) are:

Members of Parliament

^ by poll

Election results

General elections 2019

Bye Election 2018

General elections 2014

General elections 2009

General elections 1999

See also
 Bhandara Lok Sabha constituency ( 1951 to 2004 elections for 1st to 14th Lok Sabha )
 Gondia Lok Sabha constituency ( 1962 election to 3rd Lok Sabha)
 Bhandara district
 Gondia district
 List of Constituencies of the Lok Sabha

References

External links
BhandaraGondiya lok sabha  constituency election 2019 results details

Lok Sabha constituencies in Maharashtra
Lok Sabha constituencies in Maharashtra created in 2008
Bhandara district
Gondia district